Orestes Destrade Cucuas (born May 8, 1962) is a Cuban former professional baseball infielder. He played in Major League Baseball (MLB) for the New York Yankees, Pittsburgh Pirates, and Florida Marlins. Destrade also played in Nippon Professional Baseball (NPB) for the Seibu Lions. He was also a broadcaster for the Tampa Bay Rays for 11 seasons. He was nicknamed "The Big O".

Biography
Destrade was born in Santiago de Cuba, Cuba, but emigrated to the United States with his family at the age of six. During his youth, he played in the Khoury League at Tamiami Park in Miami. He graduated from Christopher Columbus High School in Miami, and later attended Florida College.

Professional baseball career
After college, he played many seasons in the minor leagues before his career at the major league level. Destrade was called up in September 1987 with the New York Yankees. Destrade was a member of the Florida Marlins' 1993 inaugural season.

Destrade played five seasons (1989–1992 and 1995) for the Seibu Lions of the Japanese Pacific League, where he led the league in home runs for three consecutive years. He was also the MVP of the 1990 Japan Series. Despite his short career in Japan, Destrade is considered one of NPB's best career switch-hitters.

Broadcasting career
Destrade appeared on ESPN's Baseball Tonight. He provided color commentary for the 2006 World Baseball Classic and broadcast again with the 2009 World Baseball Classic for ESPN. He helped broadcast the 2007, 2008 & 2009 Little League World Series. Until April  he was co-host of XM Radio's Baseball This Morning show on MLB Home Plate, XM channel 175, along with Buck Martinez and Mark Patrick. Destrade also worked as an on-field reporter during the Tampa Bay Rays' 2010 postseason celebration after clinching a playoff spot. 

Destrade became a broadcaster with the Tampa Bay Rays in 2011. He co-hosted the program Rays Live which aired as the pre and post-game analysis. Destrade was notable for clutching a baseball during his broadcasts — including radio broadcasts. On February 22, 2023, it was announced that Destrade would not be returning for the 2023 Rays season.

Personal life
Orestes is married and is the father of four children: Danielle, Devin, Armando, and Isabella.

References

External links

1962 births
Living people
Albany-Colonie Yankees players
Buffalo Bisons (minor league) players
Cuban emigrants to the United States
Columbus Clippers players
Florida Marlins players
Fort Lauderdale Yankees players
Greensboro Hornets players
Major League Baseball first basemen
Major League Baseball players from Cuba
Cuban expatriate baseball players in the United States
Nashville Sounds players
New York Yankees players
Nippon Professional Baseball designated hitters
Oneonta Yankees players
Pittsburgh Pirates players
Seibu Lions players
Sportspeople from Santiago de Cuba
Christopher Columbus High School (Miami-Dade County, Florida) alumni